Andrés Felipe Cadavid Cardona (born December 28, 1985), known as Andrés Cadavid, is a Colombian footballer who plays for Independiente Medellín.

Notes

External links
 
 
 
 

1985 births
Living people
Colombian footballers
Colombian expatriate footballers
Footballers from Medellín
Atlético Bello footballers
Atlético Huila footballers
Patriotas Boyacá footballers
América de Cali footballers
Deportivo Cali footballers
San Luis F.C. players
Millonarios F.C. players
Envigado F.C. players
Club Atlético Colón footballers
Independiente Medellín footballers
Categoría Primera A players
Liga MX players
Argentine Primera División players
Expatriate footballers in Argentina
Expatriate footballers in Mexico
Colombian expatriate sportspeople in Mexico
Association football defenders